Maria Aurora von Spiegel, born Fatima (1681 – fl 1733), also referred to as Fatime, Fatima Kariman or Fatima von Kariman, was the Ottoman Turkish mistress of Augustus II the Strong. Fatima was one of the many Turkish captives during the Battle of Buda. She was brought to the royal courts of Europe, including Sweden, Poland, and Saxony, and trained as a lady-in-waiting.

Life

Early life
While Maria Aurora was still a toddler she was captured by the Imperial army that took the slaves and property belonging to the Turks after the successful Imperial reconquest of Buda from the Ottoman Empire in 1686. The Swedish baron Alexander Erskin, then in Austrian service, took four women: Raziye (Roosia); Asiye (Eisia); Emine; and Fatma (Fatima). Fatima claimed to have been the wife of a mullah (a Muslim clergyman).

Baron Erskin returned to Sweden with Philip Christoph von Königsmarck, and gave Fatima to Philip's sister, Countess Maria Aurora von Königsmarck. The four women were baptised in Stockholm on 7 November 1686 in the presence of the royal court. Crown Prince Charles and Aurora von Königsmarck stood as Fatima's godparents, and she was christened Maria Aurora after Maria Aurora von Königsmarck.
She was taught etiquette and French and became a companion to Aurora von Königsmarck.

Royal mistress
In 1691 she followed her mistress to Saxony and Poland, where Aurora von Königsmarck became the royal mistress of King Augustus. She was often present at the King's visits to Aurora von Königsmarck, and in 1701 she replaced Aurora as the royal mistress. Augustus married her in 1706 to Johann George Spiegel  who died in 1715 shortly before arrest at the Festung Sonnenstein.

Augustus acknowledged his children with her, which he did not do with all of his mistresses, and seemed to have been in love with her. He often returned to her between his other relationships. She was the mother by King Augustus of Count Frederick Augustus Rutowsky and Countess Katharina Rutowska (born in 1706), who married Major-General Count Claudius Maria von Bellegarde (born in Piedmont, died in France in 1755), an ambassador to the court of Turin.

Later life
She remained a central character within the royal court after her relationship with Augustus ended, and was good friends with the influential Przebendowska, a relation of the favourite Count Fleming. At the king's death in 1733, she was given an allowance of 8000 thaler in his will.

References

 (Swedish) Personhistorisk tidskrift / Första årgången 1898-99 / 
 (German) http://www.beautifulnetwork.de/august/seiten/maetressen/fatima.html (with image)
 http://saebi.isgv.de/biografie/Friedrich_August_von_Rutowski_(1702-1764)
 Vehse: Geschichte der Deutschen Höfe del 32, Georg Ludvig von Haxthausen.
 Reiner Pommerin, Rutowski (Rutowsky), Friedrich August Graf von, in: Sächsische Biografie, hrsg. vom Institut für Sächsische Geschichte und Volkskunde e.V., bearb. von Martina Schattkowsky, Online-Ausgabe: https://web.archive.org/web/20150721202407/http://www.isgv.de/saebi (16.8.2015)

18th-century people from the Ottoman Empire
Converts to Protestantism from Islam
Mistresses of Augustus the Strong
People from Buda
18th-century Polish nobility
Swedish slaves
Slaves from the Ottoman Empire
1681 births
18th-century Polish women
17th-century women from the Ottoman Empire
Year of death unknown
17th-century slaves